Ceratarges armatus is the type species of the trilobite genus Ceratarges in the family Lichidae.

References 

Lichida
Devonian trilobites